All in the Silence is the 9th studio album by Kento Masuda released on 26 September 2012 through Kent On Music, Inc. The album contains twelve tracks. It was produced by Masuda. All in the Silence was recorded at Charles Eller Studios in Vermont with Chas Eller and Lane Gibson, Kent on Music Studio in Tokyo, and Synchrony Music Del Ray Studio in Los Angeles with Ted Namba.

Masuda composed music for renowned designer Yohji Yamamoto's Femme Autumn Winter 2011–2012 Paris Fashion Week fashion show which featured his compositions Hands and Little Tokyo Poetry. They continued to collaborate on Masuda's creative short music film Godsend Rondo directed by Tomo Oya in Hokkaido.

Track listing

Awards and nominations

References

External links 

Kento Masuda albums
2012 albums
Concept albums
Instrumental albums